This is a list of wars involving the Republic of Cuba.

Footnotes

Bibliography

See also
 Military interventions of Cuba

External links

 
Cuba
Wars